Guadalcanal is an island in the Solomon Islands

Guadalcanal may also refer to:

Places 
Guadalcanal, Seville, a town in Andalusia in Spain
Guadalcanal Province, a province in the Solomon Islands

Military terms 

Guadalcanal Campaign, a World War II military campaign fought on and around Guadalcanal
USS Guadalcanal (CVE-60), a World War II escort carrier
USS Guadalcanal (LPH-7), an amphibious assault ship
Guadalcanal (1992 game), a board wargame by Avalon Hill